Tejkel     is a Dene in Khwahan Badakhshan Province in north-eastern Afghanistan.

See also
Badakhshan Province

References 

Populated places in Khwahan District